Glipodes sericans is a beetle in the genus Glipodes of the family Mordellidae. It was described in 1845 by Melsheimer.

References

Mordellidae
Beetles described in 1845